Return (Persian: Bazgasht) is a 1953 Iranian drama film directed by Samouel Khachikian.

Cast
 Arman 
 Hayedeh 
 Mehri Aghili 
 Ezzatollah Vosoogh 
 Shahin 
 Akbar Khajavi 
 Rahim Roshanian 
 Massoud Poor Zanjani

References

Bibliography 
 Mohammad Ali Issari. Cinema in Iran, 1900-1979. Scarecrow Press, 1989.

External links 
 

1953 films
1950s Persian-language films
Films directed by Samuel Khachikian
Iranian drama films
1953 drama films
Iranian black-and-white films